Irick is a surname. Notable people with the surname include:

Billy Ray Irick (1958–2018), American convicted murderer
James Irick (1923–1993), American football and basketball coach

See also
Rick (disambiguation)